Gerhard "Gerd" Barkhorn (20 March 1919 – 11 January 1983) was a German military aviator and wing commander in the Luftwaffe during World War II. As a fighter ace, he was the second most successful fighter pilot of all time after fellow pilot Erich Hartmann. Other than Hartmann, Barkhorn is the only fighter ace to ever exceed 300 claimed victories.

List of aerial victories claimed
According to US historian David T. Zabecki, Barkhorn claimed 301 victories in 1,100 combat missions. He was shot down nine times, bailed out once and was wounded twice. Author Spick states his total number of combat missions was 1,104. Mathews and Foreman, authors of Luftwaffe Aces – Biographies and Victory Claims, researched the German Federal Archives and found records for 300 aerial victory claims, plus one further unconfirmed claim. All of his aerial victories were claimed on the Eastern Front.

Victory claims were logged to a map-reference (PQ = Planquadrat), for example "PQ 44793". These sectors were then subdivided into 36 smaller units to give a location area 3 × 4 km in size.

Barkhorn joined 6. Staffel (6th squadron) of Jagdgeschwader 52 (JG 52—52nd Fighter Wing) on 18 August 1940.

On 1 March 1942, Barkhorn was transferred and appointed Staffelkapitän (squadron leader) of 4. Staffel of JG 52.

On 1 September 1943, Barkhorn was appointed Gruppenkommandeur (group commander) of II. Gruppe (2nd group) of JG 52.

Notes

References

Citations

Bibliography

 
 
 
 
 
 
 
 

Aerial victories of Barkhorn, Gerhard
Barkhorn, Gerhard
Aviation in World War II